Mark McLaughlin (born 2 December 1975) is a Scottish former professional footballer.

Since turning senior in 1999, McLaughlin has played over 100 games for both Clyde and Hamilton Academical. He has also played for Greenock Morton and Dumbarton.

Career
McLaughlin, a defender, began his career at junior club Arthurlie before moving to Clyde in 1999.

Clyde
McLaughlin made his debut with Clyde in a 3–1 win away from home against Stenhousemuir. On 7 October 2000 he scored his first senior football goal away to Alloa Athletic at the Recreation Park Alloa's home ground and only two weeks later he scored in a 2–2 draw against Ross County at Broadwood in the Scottish Football League First Division.

In July 2002, McLaughlin had a trial with Luton Town, which was later cancelled because he was struggling with an injury.

Hamilton
After five years at Clyde, he joined Hamilton Academical in 2004. He was part of the 2007–08 campaign for promotion to the SPL.

Greenock Morton
After McLaughlin's contract expired at Hamilton, he rejected a new deal and decided to join the team that he has supported since childhood, Greenock Morton.

McLaughlin was named as Morton's captain in August 2012. He was released from his Morton contract on Christmas Eve 2013. Since leaving Greenock Morton, McLaughlin says his departure left him "disappointed" because "Kenny Shiels said to me that I maybe wasn't going to play much. That's fair enough. He then told me that Airdrieonians had come in and asked if they could take me on loan. He said Airdrie would pay half my wages and Morton would pay half my wages, but I said, 'Well, I don't want to go out on loan'.

Dumbarton
After McLaughlin was released by Morton, he signed for SPFL Championship side Dumbarton. He was given the number 5 shirt. He scored his first goal for the club in a 5–1 win against Alloa Athletic on his third appearance.On 16 May 2014 McLaughlin signed a new one-year deal with the Sons.

In January 2015 'Marko' was released by the club following a lack of game time.

Clyde
On 20 January 2015, McLaughlin signed for Clyde for a second time. He was released at the end of the 2015–16 season and returned to the juniors with Beith. He retired in June 2018.

Personal life
McLaughlin grew up in Port Glasgow.

Honours 

 Arthurlie
 Scottish Junior Cup: 1997–98

 Clyde
 Scottish Second Division: 1999–2000

 Hamilton Academical
Scottish First Division: 2007–08

 Beith Juniors
 West Region Premiership: 2017–18
 Evening Times Champions Cup: 2017–18

References

External links

1975 births
Clyde F.C. players
Association football central defenders
Hamilton Academical F.C. players
Scottish Junior Football Association players
Living people
Scottish Football League players
Scottish footballers
Scottish Premier League players
Arthurlie F.C. players
Footballers from Greenock
Greenock Morton F.C. players
Scottish Professional Football League players
Dumbarton F.C. players
Beith Juniors F.C. players